Garry Hughes (b. 29 October 1952) is an Australian former professional rugby league footballer who played in the 1970s and 1980s. He played for the Canterbury-Bankstown Bulldogs.

He is the brother of Graeme Hughes and Mark Hughes. They played together in Canterbury's 1980 premiership side.

His sons Glen, Corey and Steven also played for the club.

After retirement he worked for the Bulldogs as football manager. He was sacked from this job in 2004 following an incident at Coffs Harbour.

References

External links
Garry Hughes at Rugby League Project

1952 births
Living people
Australian rugby league players
Canterbury-Bankstown Bulldogs players
Garry
Rugby league players from Sydney
Rugby league five-eighths